Adelantando is the seventh album by the Spanish Latin rock group Jarabe de Palo, released on April 10, 2007, following the release of the single "Olé" on March 17.

Track listing 
 Adelantando (Con La Shica)- 3:37
 Olé - 3:44
 No Escondas Tu Corazón - 3:47
 Avisa a Tu Madre (Con Carlos Tarque-McLan) - 3:13
 Me Gusta Como Eres - 3:46
 Blablabla - 3:36
 Déjame Vivir (Con La Mari de Chambao) - 3:39
 Voy a Llevármela Leve - 3:39
 No Te Duermas - 3:26
 Estamos Prohibidos - 3:16
 A Tu Lado - 3:42
 Me Gusta Como Eres (Versión Italiana Con Niccolò Fabi) - 10:33

2007 albums
Jarabe de Palo albums